John Hayes (20 July 1832 - 28 January 1911) was a veteran of the American Civil War and a recipient of the Medal of Honor.

Biography
Hayes was born in the Colony of Newfoundland, but left his home at an early age to work on British and American merchant vessels in the years leading up to the Civil War. He joined the United States Navy in December 1861. He served throughout the Civil War and was discharged in August 1868.

Later in 1868, Hayes moved to Milwaukee, Wisconsin and served on several ships that sailed the Great Lakes. He soon abandoned his naval lifestyle and settled down on a farm in Wisconsin and married.  Near the end of his life, Hayes moved to Blairstown, Iowa, to be near his daughter. He died in January 1911.

Battle of Cherbourg
The ship was pursuing the CSS Alabama, a successful commerce raiding ship. On June 19, 1864, the Kearsarge found the Alabama off of the coast of the French port of Cherbourg. The two ships battled, and the Alabama was destroyed in less than an hour. The accuracy of the gun operated by Hayes was instrumental in sinking the Alabama. Hayes received the Medal of Honor for his actions during the battle.

Citation

See also
List of Medal of Honor recipients
List of American Civil War Medal of Honor recipients: G–L
Battle of Cherbourg (1864)
CSS Alabama

Notes

References

External links

1832 births
1911 deaths
American Civil War recipients of the Medal of Honor
People from Newfoundland (island)
United States Navy Medal of Honor recipients
Union Navy sailors